C minor is a minor scale based on C, consisting of the pitches C, D, E, F, G, A, and B. Its key signature consists of three flats. Its relative major is E major and its parallel major is C major.

The C natural minor scale is:

Changes needed for the melodic and harmonic versions of the scale are written in with accidentals as necessary. The C harmonic minor and melodic minor scales are:

Notable compositions

Charles-Valentin Alkan
Prelude Op. 31, No. 16 (Assez lentement)
Symphony for Solo Piano, 1st movement: Allegro
Trois grandes études, Op. 76, No. 3 "Mouvement semblable et perpetuel" (Rondo-Toccata) for the hands reunited
Johannes Sebastian Bach
Passacaglia and Fugue in C minor, BWV 582
Lute Suite in C minor, BWV 997
Cello Suite No. 5, BWV 1011
The Musical Offering, BWV 1079
Partita No. 2, BWV 826
Ludwig van Beethoven (See Beethoven and C minor)
Piano Sonata No. 5
Piano Sonata No. 8 (Pathétique)
Piano Concerto No. 3
Coriolan Overture
Symphony No. 5
Choral Fantasy
Piano Sonata No. 32
Johannes Brahms
Symphony No. 1
String Quartet Op. 51/1
Piano Trio No. 3
Piano Quartet No. 3
Anton Bruckner
Symphony No. 1
Symphony No. 2
Symphony No. 8
Frédéric Chopin
Rondo Op. 1
Piano Sonata No. 1
Étude Op. 10, No. 12 (Revolutionary)
Étude Op. 25, No. 12 (Ocean)
Prélude Op. 28, No. 20 "Funeral March"
Nocturne in C minor, Op. 48, No. 1
Nocturne in C minor, Op. posth. (Chopin)
Mazurka Op. 56, No. 3
Gabriel Fauré
Élégie, Op. 24
Joseph Haydn
Piano Sonata Hob. XVI/20
Franz Liszt
Transcendental Étude No. 8 "Wilde Jagd"
Gustav Mahler
Symphony No. 2 "Auferstehung"
Felix Mendelssohn
Symphony No. 1
Wolfgang Amadeus Mozart
Great Mass in C minor, KV 427/417a
Piano Concerto No. 24, KV 491
Maurerische Trauermusik KV 477
Sergei Prokofiev
Symphony No. 3, Op. 44
Sergei Rachmaninoff
Piano Concerto No. 2
Camille Saint-Saëns
Symphony No. 3 (Organ Symphony)
Dmitri Shostakovich
String Quartet No. 8
Symphony No. 4
Symphony No. 8
Franz Schubert
Symphony No. 4, D. 417
Piano Sonata No. 19, D. 958
Impromptu No. 1, D. 899

See also
Key (music)
Major and minor
Chord (music)
Chord notation

External links
 

Musical keys
Minor scales